The Battle of Rumani Coast was a naval engagement that took place on the night of July 11, 1967 between Israeli and Egyptian naval forces, near the vicinity of Rumani. Two Egyptian motor torpedo boats were sunk in the action for no Israeli losses.

Background
Following Israel's victory in the Six-Day War, Israel's coastline was significantly enlarged and now included the Sinai Peninsula coast. The Israeli Navy now sought to enforce Israeli sovereignty over this large area and began regular patrols of the Sinai coastline up to the approaches of Port Said.

Battle
On July 9 , an ex-British Royal Navy Z-class destroyer commanded by Yitzhak Shushan, proceeded due west toward the Sinai coast. INS Eilat subsequently rendezvoused with ex-French motor torpedo boats Aya and Daya. The flotilla patrolled northwest of the Sinai coast, under orders to stop vessels crossing the demarkation line toward the Sinai coast.

On July 11 at approximately 21:45, the signals intelligence intercept operator in Eilat reported two Egyptian missile boats were about to sortie. The Israeli torpedo boats picked up a target on radar shortly thereafter. The Israelis marked a course to intercept. Eilat closed from the north, Aya and Daya from the east. The Egyptian vessels, later identified as P 6-class torpedo boats, discovered the Israeli MTBs approaching at full speed and commenced fire. The Israelis returned fire with Bofors and Oerlikons. The initial run scored no hits but the Egyptian MTBs dispersed. The separation enabled Eilat to close one and the two MTBs the other. Twenty minutes later, both P 6s were ablaze. The fire caused their torpedoes to explode. There were no Israeli losses and no known Egyptian survivors.

References

Gallery

Rumani Coast
1967 in the Israeli Military Governorate
1967 in Egypt
Rumani Coast
July 1967 events in Africa
Naval battles of the War of Attrition
July 1967 events in Asia